The 8th Gold Cup was a motor race, run to Formula One rules, held on 23 September 1961 at Oulton Park, England. The race was run over 60 laps of the circuit, and was won by British driver Stirling Moss in a Ferguson P99.

This was the only time a Formula One race has been won by a four-wheel drive car, the damp conditions proving ideal for the car's extra traction.

Results

References
 "The Grand Prix Who's Who", Steve Small, 1995.
 "The Formula One Record Book", John Thompson, 1974.

International Gold Cup
International Gold Cup
Gold